The 2012 Men's U23 Pan-American Volleyball Cup was the first edition of the bi-annual men's volleyball tournament, played by five countries from September 25 – 30, 2012 at the Langley Events Centre in Langley, British Columbia, Canada.

Competing nations

Pool standing procedure
Match won 3–0: 5 points for the winner, 0 point for the loser
Match won 3–1: 4 points for the winner, 1 points for the loser
Match won 3–2: 3 points for the winner, 2 points for the loser
The first criterion is the number of matches won, second criterion is points gained by the team
In case of tie, the teams were classified according to the following criteria:
points ratio and sets ratio

Competition format
The competition format for the first Men's U23 Pan-American Volleyball Cup consists of two phases, the first is a Round-Robin round between all five competing nations. After the Round-Robin finishes, 3rd and 4th place nations according to ranking will play for the bronze and 1st and 2nd place nations according to ranking will play for the gold.

Round robin
 Venue:  Langley Events Centre, Langley, British Columbia, Canada
 All times are Pacific Standard Time Zone (UTC−08:00)

Finals

3rd place match

Final

Final standing

Individual awards

Most Valuable Player

Best Scorer

Best Spiker

Best Blocker

Best Server

Best Digger

Best Setter

Best Receiver

Best Libero

References

Men's Pan-American Volleyball Cup
Men's U23 Pan-American Volleyball Cup
Men's U23 Pan-American Volleyball Cup
2012 Men's U23 Pan-American Volleyball Cup
Sports competitions in British Columbia